Karl Kögel (born 26 October 1917) was a German ice hockey player who competed for the German national team at the 1936 Winter Olympics in Garmisch-Partenkirchen. He played club hockey for EV Füssen.

References

External links
  

1917 births
Possibly living people
German ice hockey left wingers
Ice hockey players at the 1936 Winter Olympics
Olympic ice hockey players of Germany
Sportspeople from Füssen